The Primetime Emmy Award for Outstanding Directing for Variety Series is awarded to one television series each year. After being grouped together for decades as Outstanding Directing for Variety or Music Program, categories were divided for series and Outstanding Directing for a Variety Special in 2009.

In the following list, the first titles listed in gold are the winners; those not in gold are nominees, which are listed in alphabetical order. The years given are those in which the ceremonies took place:



Winners and nominations

1970s

1990s

2000s

2010s

2020s

Programs with multiple wins

11 wins
 Saturday Night Live

4 wins
 The Carol Burnett Show

Programs with multiple nominations
Totals include nominations for Primetime Emmy Award for Outstanding Directing for Nonfiction Programming.

23 nominations
 Saturday Night Live

15 nominations
 Late Show with David Letterman

12 nominations
 The Daily Show with Jon Stewart

10 nominations
 The Colbert Report

7 nominations
 Last Week Tonight with John Oliver
 Late Night with David Letterman

6 nominations
 American Idol
 The Carol Burnett Show
 The Late Show with Stephen Colbert
 The Tonight Show with Jay Leno

4 nominations
 Portlandia

3 nominations
 The Flip Wilson Show
 The Sonny and Cher Comedy Hour
 The Tonight Show Starring Jimmy Fallon

2 nominations
 A Black Lady Sketch Show
 Da Ali G Show
 Drunk History
 Inside Amy Schumer
 The Jim Henson Hour
 Jimmy Kimmel Live!
 Late Night with Seth Meyers
 The Late Late Show with James Corden
 The Muppet Show
 Real Time with Bill Maher
 Tracey Takes On...
 The Tracey Ullman Show

Notes

References

External links
 Academy of Television Arts and Sciences website

Directing for a Variety Series